Open Letter is the third studio album by American R&B singer Case. It was released by Def Soul, the R&B division of Def Jam Recordings, on April 24, 2001 in the United States. The album peaked at number five on the US Billboard 200 and was certified Gold by the Recording Industry Association of America (RIAA). It was preceded by the Tim & Bob-produced single "Missing You", which earned Case a nomination for Best Male R&B Vocal Performance at the 44th Grammy Awards in 2002. Open Letter was Case's last album on Def Soul and Def Jam Recordings.

Critical reception 

Vibe contributor David Thigpen gave note of the "earthier, more robust brand of R&B" that Case performs throughout the record, saying his songwriting resembles the "strong melodies and complex, rich arrangements" of R. Kelly and found tracks like "Love of My Life" and "Shine" containing influences of "late '70s Stevie Wonder-style soul." He concluded that, "Case is no dusty retro-soulstar, though. Draped in old-school rhythms, his earnestly romantic messages still sound fresh." Neil Drumming of Blender said that Case lacked conviction in delivering sexual lyrics but that the overall vibe of the songs help mask it, concluding that "Fortunately, the romance here outweighs the horizontal hula roughly five to one. So there is a place for Case — just not in the bedroom." Jon Azpiri of AllMusic criticized the album for containing generic R&B compositions and Case for lacking emotion in his performance, concluding that "For his third album, Case fails to create even one original moment; perhaps this Open Letter should have never been written."

Track listing

Personnel
Credits adapted from the album's liner notes. 
 Keyboards and Drum Programming: Tim Kelley, Bob Robinson, Ray Watkins, Redhead, Shep Crawford, Arvel McClinton, Harold Edgar
 Bass: Daryl Edgar
 Guitar: Steve Estiverne, Andeas Panagapolous
 Background vocals: Case, Gromyko Collins, David Guppy, Eric Roberson, Larry "Jazz" Anthony, Eritza Laues, Shep Crawford, Montell Jordan, Charlie Wilson
 Recording engineer: Jan Fairchild, Giz, Mike T., Stephen George, Andy Heller, Eddie Hudson, Annie Catalino
 Mixing: Jan Fairchild, Serban Ghenea, Stephen George, Jan Fairchild
 Executive producer: Case, JoJo "Bangs" Brim, Kevin Liles
 Art direction & design: Akisia Grigsby

Charts

Weekly charts

Year-end charts

Certifications

References

2001 albums
Case (singer) albums
Def Jam Recordings albums
Albums produced by Tim & Bob
Albums produced by Jimmy Jam and Terry Lewis